Yap Kim Hock  (born on 2 August 1970) is a retired badminton player from Malaysia. He is currently the doubles head coach of the Singapore national badminton team.

Career 
He had played with different pairs such as Tan Kim Her (1989–1994) and Cheah Soon Kit (1995–2000). Yap represented Malaysia and competed at the 1996 Atlanta Olympics and the 2000 Sydney Olympics in the badminton men's doubles event with Cheah Soon Kit. At the 1996 Atlanta Olympics, they had a bye in the first round and defeated Denny Kantono and Antonius Ariantho of Indonesia in semifinals. In the final, Cheah and Yap lost to Rexy Mainaky and Ricky Subagja of Indonesia 15–5, 13–15, 12–15. At the 2000 Sydney Olympics, they could only reach the second round before losing to the Korean doubles.

Achievements

Olympic Games 
Men's doubles

World Championships 
Men's doubles

World Cup 
Men's doubles

Asian Championships 
Men's doubles

Asian Cup 
Men's doubles

Southeast Asian Games 
Men's doubles

Commonwealth Games 
Men's doubles

IBF World Grand Prix 
The World Badminton Grand Prix sanctioned by International Badminton Federation (IBF) from 1983 to 2006.

Men's doubles

IBF International 
Men's doubles

Honour 
Honour of Malaysia
  :
  Member of the Order of the Defender of the Realm (A.M.N.) (1995)

References

External links 
 

1970 births
Living people
People from Muar
Malaysian sportspeople of Chinese descent
Malaysian male badminton players
Badminton players at the 1996 Summer Olympics
Badminton players at the 2000 Summer Olympics
Olympic badminton players of Malaysia
Olympic silver medalists for Malaysia
Olympic medalists in badminton
Medalists at the 1996 Summer Olympics
Badminton players at the 1994 Asian Games
Asian Games bronze medalists for Malaysia
Asian Games medalists in badminton
Medalists at the 1994 Asian Games
Badminton players at the 1998 Commonwealth Games
Commonwealth Games gold medallists for Malaysia
Commonwealth Games silver medallists for Malaysia
Commonwealth Games medallists in badminton
Competitors at the 1995 Southeast Asian Games
Southeast Asian Games gold medalists for Malaysia
Southeast Asian Games silver medalists for Malaysia
Southeast Asian Games medalists in badminton
Members of the Order of the Defender of the Realm
World No. 1 badminton players
Badminton coaches
Medallists at the 1994 Commonwealth Games
Medallists at the 1998 Commonwealth Games